Baniyas Square is a rapid transit station on the Green Line of the Dubai Metro in Dubai, UAE.

History
Opened along with the initial stretch of the Green Line from Etisalat to Dubai Healthcare City stations, trains began calling at Baniyas Square on 9 September 2011. With 1.070 million passengers in 2011, it has become among the busiest stations on the Green Line.

Location
Baniyas Square is located in the central section of Deira in the historic centre of Dubai, under the square of the same name. It is the closest station to the neighbourhood of Naif and the eastern section of Al Sabkha. Nearby points of interest include the Deira Twin Towers and a number of souks. Also close by are Dubai Creek, Al Manal Centre, and the Naif Souk.

Station layout
Like other central stations on the Dubai Metro, Baniyas Square is located below ground level. It lies underneath 27th Street at its intersection with Al Maktoum Road; the tracks then head either further northwest under 27th Street towards Gold Souq or to the southeast under Al Maktoum Road. There are two side platforms with two tracks, a similar setup to most Metro stations.

References

AMTradez

External links
 

Railway stations in the United Arab Emirates opened in 2011
Dubai Metro stations